Osvaldo Carlos Puccio Huidobro (born 21 December 1952) is a Chilean politician who served as minister.

References

External links
 Puccio at Memoria Chilena

1952 births
Living people
Chilean people of Italian descent

20th-century Chilean politicians
21st-century Chilean politicians
University of Chile alumni
Humboldt University of Berlin alumni
Revolutionary Left Movement (Chile) politicians
Socialist Party of Chile politicians
Politicians from Santiago
Chilean Ministers Secretary General of Government